This is the list of restaurants located in Estonia. The list is incomplete.

References 

 
restaurants
Estonia